The 166th (South Lancashire) Brigade was an infantry brigade of the British Army that saw active service in the First World War and remained in the United Kingdom throughout the Second World War.

History

Formation
Raised in the Territorial Force as the South Lancashire Brigade, it was attached to the West Lancashire Division and was composed of the 9th and 10th (Liverpool Scottish) battalions of the King's Regiment (Liverpool) and the 4th and 5th battalions of the South Lancashire Regiment.

First World War
These later became 166th (South Lancashire) Brigade and 55th (West Lancashire) Division respectively, in 1915. The brigade served with the division on the Western Front during the First World War.

Order of battle
 1/9th Battalion, King's (Liverpool Regiment) (left March 1915)
 1/10th (Liverpool Scottish) Battalion, King's (Liverpool Regiment) (left November 1914, rejoined January 1916)
 1/4th Battalion, South Lancashire Regiment (left 13 February 1915)
 1/5th Battalion, South Lancashire Regiment (left 13 February 1915, rejoined January 1916)
 2/5th Battalion, King's Own (Royal Lancaster Regiment) (joined February 1915, left April 1915)
 1/5th Battalion, King's Own (Royal Lancaster Regiment) (joined 7 January 1916)
 1/5th Battalion, Loyal North Lancashire Regiment (joined January 1916)
 166th Machine Gun Company, Machine Gun Corps (formed 1 March 1916, moved to 55th Battalion, Machine Gun Corps 7 March 1918)
 166th Trench Mortar Battery (formed March 1916)
 2/10th (Liverpool Scottish) Battalion, King's (Liverpool Regiment) (from April 1918, absorbed into 1/10th Battalion same month)

Commanders

Inter-war period
The brigade and division were both disbanded after the war as was the Territorial Force which was reformed in 1920 as the Territorial Army. The brigade was also reformed as the 166th (South Lancashire) Infantry Brigade and again joined the 55th (West Lancashire) Infantry Division which was also reformed in the Territorial Army.

Second World War
In 1939 war with Nazi Germany was becoming increasingly likely and, as a consequence, the Territorial Army was doubled in size with each unit forming a duplicate. The 55th Division raised the duplicate 59th (Staffordshire) Infantry Division and the 166th Infantry Brigade was subsequently redesignated the 176th Infantry Brigade and was transferred to help form the new division.

A new 166th Infantry Brigade was raised in the Second World War from the redesignation of the 199th Infantry Brigade. The brigade had previously served with the 66th (East Lancashire) Infantry Division until it was disbanded in June 1940 and transferred to the 55th Division and reformed it as a standard infantry division. continued to serve with the 55th (West Lancashire) Division from 1944 until the end of the war.

Order of battle
 2/8th Battalion, Lancashire Fusiliers
 6th Battalion, Manchester Regiment
 7th Battalion, Manchester Regiment
 199th Infantry Brigade Anti-Tank Company (formed 9 July 1940, disbanded 26 December 1941)
 1st Battalion, Manchester Regiment
 2nd Battalion, Loyal Regiment (North Lancashire)
 5th Battalion, Royal Inniskilling Fusiliers
 11th Battalion, South Staffordshire Regiment
 9th Battalion, Bedfordshire and Hertfordshire Regiment
 1/4th Battalion, South Lancashire Regiment
 1st Battalion, Liverpool Scottish, (Queen's Own Cameron Highlanders)

References

Infantry brigades of the British Army in World War I
Infantry brigades of the British Army in World War II
Military units and formations established in 1908
B166